These are the top 50 albums of 1989 in Australia from the Australian Recording Industry Association (ARIA) End of Year Albums Chart. These were the second End of Year album charts created by ARIA, it had started producing its own charts from mid-1988. ARIA had previously used the Kent Music Report, known from 1987 onwards as the Australian Music Report.

Peak chart positions from early 1988 were calculated by David Kent for the Kent Music Report. Late 1988 and all 1989 peak chart positions are from the ARIA Charts. Overall position on the End of Year Chart is calculated by ARIA based on the number of weeks and position that the records reach within the Top 50 albums for each week during 1989.

Notes

References

Australian record charts
1989 in Australian music
1989 record charts